Keltinmäki is a district of Jyväskylä, Finland. It is located about 5–6 kilometers southwest of the city center. Keltinmäki was built mostly during the 1970s, but some areas in the district were built in the 1980s–2000s. The residential buildings in Keltinmäki are mostly apartment buildings and row houses, but there are also some single-family house neighborhoods in the area.

Church 

The Keltinmäki Church was built in 1991-1992. It was designed by the architect Olavi Noronen. The altarpiece was made by Penni Rainio.

The church has two bells: one of the bells has the word tulkaa (come) written on it, while the other one reads menkää (go), commanding people to spread the gospel to everyone.

Gallery

References 

Neighbourhoods of Jyväskylä